George Arthur Padmore (July 16, 1915 – April 15, 2005) was a Liberian diplomat. From 1956 to 1961 he was Liberian Ambassador to the United States.

Life
Padmore was born on July 16, 1915, the grandson of General George Stanley Padmore, and the son of James Stanley Padmore and Mary Louise Barclay-Padmore, who had emigrated to Liberia from Barbados. His older sister was Antoinette Tubman. After Padmore's parents died in a canoeing accident on the Saint Paul River, he became the adopted son of the politician Edwin Barclay and his wife Euphemia.

In April 1939 Padmore married Edith Mai Wiles, who would later serve as Liberia's first woman cabinet minister. The couple had five children.

Padmore died at Holy Cross Hospital in Silver Spring, Maryland on April 15, 2005.

Works
 Memoirs of a Liberian Ambassador. Edwin Mellen Press, 1996.

References

1915 births
2005 deaths
Ambassadors of Liberia to the United States
20th-century Liberian diplomats